The 1955 season was Cherno More's fourth successive season in the Republican Football Group A. The club competed as VMS Stalin after Varna was renamed after the Soviet dictator in December 1949.

Overview
The season started with five successive wins against the traditionally strong Sofia teams but ended in relegation on goal difference. After the flying start, there was great enthusiasm among players in the club and talk of becoming champions. According to Vasil Dossev, who scored the winning goal against Dinamo in Sofia, he insisted the team focus on gaining enough points to avoid relegation. He was removed from his position as captain for his statements and defeatist attitude.

With relegation looming in October, Cherno More recorded the club's joint-record win in the top flight by thrashing Cherveno Zname Pavlikeni 8-0 in the penultimate game of the season. This was followed by an away win against Spartak in Plovdiv, allowing the team to move four points clear of Zavod 12, who had two games in hand. Zavod 12 defeated Lokomotiv Plovdiv 2-0 and Spartak Plovdiv 2-1 in matches played long after Cherno More's season had ended. Both teams gained 25 points, with Zavod 12's goal difference 26-27 and Cherno More's 26-28, resulting in the relegation of Cherno More Varna from the league.

Republican Football Group A

Matches

League standings

Results summary

Soviet Army Cup

References

External links
 http://www.retro-football.bg/?q=bg/1954
 https://bulgarian-football.com/archive/1955/a-grupa.html

PFC Cherno More Varna seasons
Cherno More Varna
Cherno More Varna